Proutiella tegyra is a moth of the family Notodontidae. It is found in lowland forests of western Amazonia in South America, including Brazil, Ecuador and Peru.

References

External links
Species page at Tree of Life project
https://archive.org/details/diegrossschmette06seit_0/page/69/mode/1up?view=theater

Notodontidae of South America
Fauna of the Amazon
Moths described in 1899